Bucaram is a surname. Notable people with the surname include:

Abdalá Bucaram (born 1952), Ecuadorian politician and lawyer, President of Ecuador from 10 August 1996 to 6 February 1997
Assad Bucaram (1916–1981), Ecuadorian politician of Lebanese descent, Mayor of Guayaquil (1962–1963, 1968–1970)
Martha Bucaram (born Guayaquil, Ecuador, 1963), Ecuadorian economist and politician
Averroes Bucaram, Ecuadorian politician, son of Assad and cousin of Abdala, president of the legislature

See also